The Bouzincourt Ridge Cemetery is a military cemetery located in the Somme region of France commemorating British and Commonwealth soldiers who fought in World War I. The cemetery contains mainly those who died capturing the village of Bouzincourt between June and August 1918 and those who died on the front line near Bouzincourt.

Location 
The cemetery is located to the east of the village of Bouzincourt, approximately 3 kilometers northwest of Albert, France on the D938 road.

Establishment of the Cemetery 
The cemetery was started in the first week of September 1918 by the British V Corps, mainly for soldiers from the 12th and 18th Divisions who had died during the capturing Bouzincourt the two months prior (June - August 1918). After the end of the war, more plots were added to house approximately 500 more soldiers who were moved in from the surrounding area. The cemetery was designed by Sir Reginald Blomfield and Arthur James Scott Hutton.

Statistics 
The cemetery covers an area of 2480 square meters, and contains a total of 709 burials, of which 396 are identified and 313 are unidentified. There exists a special memorial for an officer of the British 38th Division who is believed to be buried among the unknown.

References 

World War I cemeteries in France
Somme (department)